The Kentucky Mr. Basketball honor recognizes the top high school senior basketball player in the state of Kentucky. The first Kentucky Mr. Basketball was "King" Kelly Coleman of Wayland High School in 1956. The winner of the Mr. Basketball award wears #1 on his jersey in the summer all-star series against the Indiana High School All-Stars. 1940 was the first year for the Kentucky/Indiana High School All-Star Series, that year, the Indiana All-Stars defeated the Kentucky All-Stars 31–29. The Kentucky Mr. Basketball award is the third oldest such award in the nation; only Indiana Mr. Basketball and California Mr. Basketball, which were first awarded in 1939 and 1950, respectively, predate it.

The award is presented annually by the Kentucky Lions Eye Foundation.

Award winners
NBA teams listed are teams known, or teams that drafted the player.

Schools with multiple winners

1.Reflects awards won by schools that have since been consolidated.

Colleges with multiple winners

See also
Kentucky "Miss Basketball"
Mr. Football Award (Kentucky)

References

Mr. and Miss Basketball awards
Basketball in Kentucky
Awards established in 1956
1956 establishments in Kentucky
Mr. Basketball
Mr. Basketball